Džepin is a village in the municipality of Struga, North Macedonia.

Demographics
As of the 2021 census, Džepin had 122 residents with the following ethnic composition:
Albanians 119
Persons for whom data are taken from administrative sources 3

According to the 2002 census, the village had a total of 424 inhabitants. Ethnic groups in the village include:
Albanians 423
Others 1

References

External links

Villages in Struga Municipality
Albanian communities in North Macedonia